"The Good Son" is the pilot episode of the television sitcom Frasier. It premiered on September 16, 1993, on NBC. It introduces the primary characters and settings, and distances itself from its parent series Cheers.

The final draft of the script was published on April 29, 1993. Excerpts from the show were promoted as the series finale of Cheers aired on May 20, 1993. This episode set up a number of recurring gags for the series, such as Martin's recliner and the unseen character of Maris Crane.

Plot
Six months after the conclusion of Cheers, Dr. Frasier Crane is divorced from Lilith Sternin and has moved back to his hometown of Seattle, Washington, looking for a fresh start. Since the move, Frasier has been hosting a talk-radio show on KACL 780 AM Talk Radio as an on-air psychiatrist, alongside producer Roz Doyle.

Frasier is approached by his brother, Niles, who informs him that their father, Martin, a retired police officer injured in the line of duty, can no longer live by himself due to his injuries. In hopes of renewing their father-son relationship, Frasier offers to take his father in.

Martin moves into Frasier's apartment but Frasier is appalled when Martin brings in his thread-bare recliner and Parson Russell Terrier Eddie, both of which greatly upset Frasier. Some time afterwards, Niles and unseen his wife, Maris, offer to help Frasier take care of Martin by jointly paying for a health care provider. Martin convinces Frasier to hire Daphne Moon, an eccentric immigrant from Manchester, England, who claims to be "a bit psychic,” much to Frasier's displeasure. After Daphne reveals that she needs to move in, Frasier, who doesn't want more people living in his apartment, rejects her. This leads to an argument with Martin, which ends with Frasier walking out of the apartment.

The next day at work, Frasier confides his troubles with Roz. In turn, she tells him the story of Lupe Vélez; she points out that although things might not go as planned, they can work out anyway. Frasier then takes his next call, only to find an apologetic Martin on the line. Frasier then atones for his arrogance and reconciles with his father. The next call is from a woman, upset and tearful about breaking up with her boyfriend. Frasier proceeds to tell her the story of Vélez. The episode ends with Daphne, Martin, and Frasier watching TV in his apartment in the evening while Eddie silently stares at a disturbed Frasier.

Awards
 David Angell, Peter Casey, and David Lee won the Primetime Emmy Award for writing this episode.
 James Burrows won the Directors Guild of America Award and the Primetime Emmy Award for directing this episode.
 For his performance in this episode, Kelsey Grammer won the Primetime Emmy Award for Outstanding Lead Actor in a Comedy Series. This was his second nomination in this category and his first win.

Notes

1993 American television episodes
Frasier episodes
American television series premieres
Television episodes directed by James Burrows
Emmy Award-winning episodes